CardMobili is a European-based mobile application development company founded in 2009. The primary application of the company, also named CardMobili, provided a platform for managing customer loyalty programs via mobile phones. The application provided for digitizing and storing loyalty and membership cards, allowing their barcodes to be scanned directly from the device screen. It supported Android, iPhone, BlackBerry, Windows Phone 7, Windows Mobile, Nokia, Vodafone, and other brands. CardMobili and the Portuguese Bank Banco Espírito Santo collaborated to launch the world's first digital credit card.

On April 30, 2016, the application was removed from app stores and online features ceased functioning.

Awards and reception
In 2010, Cardmobili won Vodafone's "Mobile Clicks" contest for the best mobile internet startup.

See also

References

Further reading
 
  "The technology that puts the wallet inside the phone"
  "Loyalty cards are in the digital world"
 "Cardmobili and RouletteCricket: great startups, Vodafone Mobile Clicks winners"
  "Customers are more loyal to brands with cards on your phone"
  "Portuguese want to do away with plastic loyalty cards"
 The Register article
  "Ten thousand Portuguese joined the digital copy of voter registration card in the phone"
  "Cardmobili wins global competition for applications in Barcelona"
  "Cardmobili represent Portugal in the final contest of Vodafone"
 The Register article

External links
 

Software companies established in 2009
Android (operating system) software
IOS software
BlackBerry software
Windows Phone software
2009 establishments in Portugal
Software companies disestablished in 2016
2016 disestablishments in Portugal